Edgar Calabia Samar (born 1981) is a poet and novelist from San Pablo City, Philippines. He has received the Philippine National Book Awards for his novels and book of criticism, and the Palanca Awards for his poetry collections and short fiction. His novels Sa Kasunod ng 909, Si Janus Silang at ang Tiyanak ng Tabon and Si Janus Silang at ang Labanang Manananggal-Mambabarang all won the Philippine National Book Awards for Best Novel in a Philippine Language in 2012, 2015, and 2016, respectively. He has also been awarded the PBBY-Salanga Writer's Prize, the NCCA Writer's Prize for the Novel, the Gantimpalang Collantes sa Sanaysay, and the Gawad Surian sa Tula. His poetry books, Pag-aabang sa Kundiman: Isang Tulambuhay and Samantalang Sakop at Iniibig: Panibagong Tulambuhay were both nominated for the National Book Award. His award-winning children story Uuwi na ang Nanay Kong si Adarna has been adapted into play and was staged at the Cultural Center of the Philippines as part of The Virgin Labfest in July 2008. The same story was also adapted for television in a storytelling segment of GMA-7's Art Angel episode last May 29, 2008. His book, Walong Diwata ng Pagkahulog, was recipient of the 2005 NCCA Writer's Prize; its translation to English as Eight Muses of the Fall was longlisted in the 2009 Man Asian Literary Prize. Samar is also fellow to the 2010 International Writing Program of the University of Iowa.

Biography

Samar was born on 18 February 1981 in San Pablo City, Philippines. He attended a diocesan catholic school, the Liceo de San Pablo, from grade school to high school (1988–1998) before he entered the Ateneo de Manila University where he finished his AB in Psychology (2002) and MA in Filipino Literature (2004). In Ateneo, he became a member of Heights for four years (1998–2002). He received his Doctor of Philosophy from the University of the Philippines in Diliman, which awarded him the Gawad Antonio Abad for Best Dissertation in 2011.

Samar teaches Philippine Literature and Creative Writing at the Ateneo de Manila University since 2011. He served as President of Linangan sa Imahen, Retorika at Anyo in 2002–2004, and now acts as moderator of Heights. He has served as panelist to several national writers workshops in the Philippines. He also directed the 7th Ateneo National Writers Workshop held in October 2007 at the Sacred Heart Novitiate in Quezon City. He currently lives in Marikina.

Published works

Books
"Si Janus Sílang at ang Tiyanak ng Tábon" (Adarna House, 2014)

"Eight Muses of the Fall" (Anvil Publishing, 2013)
"Halos Isang Búhay: Ang Manananggal sa Pagsusulat ng Nobela" (UST Publishing House, 2012)
"Sa Kasunod ng 909" (UST Publishing House, 2012)
Walong Diwata ng Pagkahulog (Anvil Publishing, 2009)
Pag-aabang sa Kundiman: Isang Tulambuhay (ADMU Office of Research and Publications, 2006)
Isa na Namang Pagtingala sa Buwan (National Commission for Culture and the Arts, 2005)
Uuwi na ang Nanay Kong si Darna! (Adarna House, 2002).

Poetry
  "Kuwentong-Bayan" in Literatura 8: Tha Palanca 2004 Issue
 "Walang Diwata ng Apoy" in Literatura 8: The Palanca 2004 Issue
"2000" in High Chair Issue # 5 (July–December 2005)
"Gnosis" in  Volume 35

Essay
"Si Big Brother, Si Boy Bastos, at ang Pagsasalba ng Katawan sa Textong Popular Ayon Kay Antonio Pigafetta" in Malay 20, No. 1 (2007)
"Paghawak sa Panahon: Ang Salaysay Bilang Talinghaga sa Tula" in Loyola Schools Review 6 (2007)

Serialized novel
Kasaysayan ng Kalibutan (2019)

Awards, grants, fellowships
2010 International Writing Program, Fellow
2009 Man Asian Literary Prize, Longlist for "Eight Muses of the Fall"
2007 Gantimpalang Collantes sa Sanaysay, Second Prize for "Tungo sa Pag-awit ng Inadung"
2007 46th UP National Writers Workshop, Fellow for Poetry in Filipino
2005 NCCA Writer's Prize,  Grand Prize for Walong Diwata ng Pagkahulog
2004 Gawad Surian sa Tula, Grand Prize for "Kung Bakit Tayo Nakikinig sa Alamat"
2004 PBBY-Salanga Writer's Prize, Honorable Mention for "Magkano Papuntang Antipolo?"
2004 Palanca Awards for Poetry in Filipino, First Prize for "Tayong Lumalakad Nang Matulin"
2003 Palanca Awards for Future Fiction in Filipino, Second Prize for "Project: EYOD"
2003 1st Iyas-La Salle National Writers' Workshop, Fellow for Poetry in Filipino
2002 Palanca Awards for Poetry in Filipino, Second Prize for "Pag-aabang sa Kundiman at Iba Pang Tula"
2002 PBBY-Salanga Writer's Prize, Grand Prize for "Uuwi na ang Nanay Kong si Darna!"
2001 38th UP National Writers Workshop, Fellow for Poetry in Filipino
2000 1st UST National Writers' Workshop, Fellow for Poetry in Filipino
1999 6th Ateneo-Heights Writers' Workshop, Fellow for Poetry in Filipino
1997 National Schools Press Conference, Second Place for Editorial Writing in Filipino

References

External links
Tales of children's stories
The Pinay in Philippine children's literature
Wanted: New Tagalog Poets
Linangan sa Imahen, Retorika at Anyo
LasticMom recommends "Uuwi na ang Nanay Kong si Darna"
"Between the workshop and the ukay-ukay"
Ateneo celebrates Buwan ng Wika at Kultura 2007
Fellows to the 7th Ateneo National Writers Workshop named
 Books that help and give counsel
Likhaan awards 20 writing fellows
Palanca harvest for 2003
Wan dey isang araw
Adarna House and AILAP award 9 Barlaya Fellowships
Ilang tala hinggil sa Nationalism and Literature
Donita brings Christmas to read-along kids
8 fellows to the 6th Barlaya workshop
UP National Writers' Workshop ends on a high note
Neni Sta. Romana Cruz's favorite books
Pag-aabang sa Kundiman: Ang pagsagka ni Elias sa katagang alea iacta est ni Caesar
Books Featuring RP Literati's Newest Gems Launched
Eden estospace: Enter the world of podcasts

1981 births
Living people
20th-century Filipino poets
People from San Pablo, Laguna
Writers from Laguna (province)
Ateneo de Manila University alumni
Academic staff of Ateneo de Manila University
International Writing Program alumni
University of the Philippines Diliman alumni
21st-century Filipino poets
Filipino male poets
20th-century male writers
21st-century male writers